Barbara Auer (born ) is a German actress. She has appeared in multiple television shows and films including My Daughter Belongs to Me (for which she won a German Film Award for "Best Actress"), and The Book Thief.

Awards
 1989: Goldene Kamera for The Boss from the West
 1991: Special Prize of the German Academy of Performing Arts for Die Arbeitersaga: Das Lachen der Maca Daracs
 1993: German Film Awards "Best Actress" for My Daughter Belongs to Me
 1995: Telestar "Best Actress" in a Move Made For TV" for Der große Abgang
 2019: Fünf Seen Filmfestival "Hannelore-Elsner-Award" for Best Art of Acting

Selected filmography
 The Boss from the West (dir. Vivian Naefe, 1988, TV film), as Jessica
 The Play with Billions (dir. Peter Keglevic, 1989, TV film), as Larissa Asselt
 Verfolgte Wege (dir. Uwe Janson, 1989), as Marie
 Mit Leib und Seele (1989–1990, TV series, 19 episodes), as Annemarie Bieler
 Herzlich willkommen (dir. Hark Bohm, 1990), as Elke Kramer
  (dir. , 1990), as Nana Schröder
 A Crazy Couple (dir. Sönke Wortmann, 1990), as Jana
 Heart in the Hand (dir. Uwe Janson, 1991), as Ena
 The Terrible Threesome (dir. Hermine Huntgeburth, 1991), as Maria Grund
 My Daughter Belongs to Me (dir. Vivian Naefe, 1991, TV film), as Ruth
 : Das Lachen der Maca Daracs (dir. , 1991, TV film), as Maca Daracs
 Night on Fire (dir. , 1992), as Uta Schwengeler
 Madregilda (dir. Francisco Regueiro, 1993), as Madregilda
 Women Are Simply Wonderful (dir. Sherry Hormann, 1994), as Kim
 Der große Abgang (dir. , 1995, TV film), as Irmgard Bode
 Nikolaikirche (dir. Frank Beyer, 1995, TV film), as Astrid Protter
 Reise nach Weimar (dir. Dominik Graf, 1996, TV film), as Mafalda La Rocca
  (dir. , 1998), as Lydia Kominka
  (dir. , 1999, TV film), as Gertrud Venske
 The State I Am In (dir. Christian Petzold, 2000), as Clara
 Donna Leon (2000–2002, TV series, 4 episodes), as Paola Brunetti
 The Other Woman (dir. Margarethe von Trotta, 2004, TV film), as Yvonne Schumacher
  (dir. , 2006), as Marlene
  (since 2006, TV series, 15 episodes), as Lisa Brenner
  (dir. , 2008), as Marlene
  (dir. , 2008), as Anna Frick
 Effi Briest (dir. Hermine Huntgeburth, 2009), as Johanna
 The Last 30 Years (dir. , 2010, TV film), as Resa Schade
 The Weekend (dir. Nina Grosse, 2012), as Tina Kessler
  (dir. , 2013, TV film), as Heike Rogel
 The Book Thief (dir. Brian Percival, 2013), as Ilsa Hermann
  (dir. , 2015, TV film), as Hella Christensen
  (dir. Roland Suso Richter, 2015, TV film), as Hildegard Grzimek
 Jonathan (dir. Piotr J. Lewandowski, 2016), as Martha

External links

20th-century German actresses
21st-century German actresses
German film actresses
German television actresses
Living people
People from Konstanz
Best Actress German Film Award winners
Year of birth missing (living people)